Peter Gray may refer to:

Peter Gray (Australian judge), Federal Court of Australia judge
Peter Gray (bioengineer) (born 1946), bioengineer in Australia
Peter Gray (chemist) (1926–2012), professor of physical chemistry at the University of Leeds
Peter Gray (historian) (born 1965), professor of modern Irish history at Queen's University Belfast
Peter Gray (military historian), military historian at Birmingham University
Peter Gray (psychologist), American psychologist and author of the introductory psychology textbook, Psychology
Peter Gray (sailor) (born 1935), Irish Olympic sailor
Peter Gray (writer) (1807–1887), Scottish writer
Peter S. Gray (born 1957), Olympic equestrian for Bermuda and Canada
Peter W. Gray (1819–1874), American lawyer, judge, and legislator from Texas
Pete Gray (1915–2002), one-armed Major League baseball player
Pete Gray (activist) (1980–2011), Australian environmental and anti-war activist
"Peter Gray" (song), American ballad

See also
The Story of Peter Grey, an Australian television daytime soap opera

Gray, Peter